Brighton and Hove Reform Synagogue is a synagogue in Hove, Sussex, England. It has 500 adult members.

History and affiliation 
The community was founded in 1955 with temporary accommodation and the synagogue was dedicated in 1967 to serve a rapidly growing community. The 400-capacity building was designed by Derek Sharp. A plaque indicates that the foundation stone was laid on 17 July 1966, or in the Hebrew calendar, 29 Tammuz 5726. It became the largest congregation in Brighton and Hove and one of the larger ones in the Reform Movement.

The first rabbi to serve the community was Rabbi Rosenblum who developed a style of prayer which combined a sense of tradition with mixed seating and inclusion of English beside a mainly Hebrew rendering of the service. In 2011 members of the synagogue voted in favour of equal rights for women congregants.

The synagogue is a member of the Movement for Reform Judaism.

Rabbi 
The synagogue's current rabbi is Dr Andrea Zanardo, who was appointed in September 2012. Rabbi Zanardo was born in Varese and was among the founders of the first Italian Progressive Congregation whilst studying for his PhD. He was ordained in July 2012 after rabbinical studies  at Leo Baeck College.

Services 
Weekly Shabbat services are held on Friday night and Saturday morning. All the Jewish festivals are celebrated. Special children's services are also held for most of the festivals.

Community 
The synagogue runs an active social and welfare department with exercise classes for older members, a book club and members teas. There is a lunch and discussion group, regular adult education classes including Hebrew classes and a cheder (religion school) for children.

Each year over a thousand pupils come from local schools to learn some basic knowledge about Judaism. The children are shown Jewish artifacts and are taught about the traditions and rituals.

See also 
Brighton and Hove Progressive Synagogue
 List of Jewish communities in the United Kingdom
 Movement for Reform Judaism

References

External links 
 
 The Movement for Reform Judaism
 Brighton & Hove Reform Synagogue on Jewish Communities and Records – UK (hosted by jewishgen.org)
Brighton & Hove Online Jewish Community

1955 establishments in England
Hove
Reform synagogues in the United Kingdom
Jewish organizations established in 1955
Synagogues completed in 1967
Synagogues in Brighton and Hove